Robert Gene Hickerson (February 15, 1935 – October 20, 2008) was an American professional football player who was an offensive guard for 15 years with the Cleveland Browns of the National Football League (NFL) from 1958 to 1960 and 1962 to 1973. Hickerson was a six-time Pro Bowler from 1965 to 1970. He was inducted to the Pro Football Hall of Fame on August 4, 2007.

Biography

Collegiate career
Hickerson was born in Trenton, Tennessee located in Gibson County, but played fullback at Trezevant High School in neighboring Carroll County. Hickerson became a tackle at Ole Miss. He was considered one of the best offensive linemen in Southeastern Conference history at the end of his collegiate career.

Professional career
Gene was drafted in the seventh round of the 1957 NFL Draft by the Browns. He was promptly shifted to the guard position on the offensive line in 1958 to better utilize his speed. He was used as a "messenger" guard by Coach Paul Brown, or a guard that delivered the plays in the huddle, while blocking for Hall of Famers Jim Brown, Bobby Mitchell, and Leroy Kelly. But after three seasons in the league, he broke his leg in 1961 and fractured the leg again later in the season while watching a game from the sidelines.

After missing two games in 1962, he recovered from the injury and never missed another game in his professional tenure. Hickerson only earned accolades after Jim Brown had retired and he was blocking for Leroy Kelly, but he earned first-team all-NFL honors five straight seasons from 1966 to 1970 and was voted to six consecutive Pro Bowls from 1966 to 1971. During his career, Hickerson's Browns never experienced a losing season and was a starter in four NFL title games, including a 1964 NFL Championship win over the Baltimore Colts 27–0. During Gene's 10 pro seasons, the Browns featured a 1,000-yard rusher every season but one in the era where the NFL season consisted of 14 games. They also had the NFL's leading rusher seven seasons of those ten. He was elected to the Browns' legends team and the NFL 1960s All-Decade Team.  In 2003, he was named to the Professional Football Researchers Association Hall of Very Good in the association's inaugural HOVG class. 

In 2007, during his induction at the Pro Football Hall of Fame in Canton, Ohio, and already suffering from the health problems that plagued the final years of his life, including dementia, Hickerson was brought onstage in his wheelchair, propelled by Bobby Mitchell, Jim Brown, and Leroy Kelly.  It was announced as "one last time, Gene Hickerson leads Bobby Mitchell, Jim Brown, and Leroy Kelly." He was inducted by his friend and former teammate at The University of Mississippi and the Cleveland Browns, Bobby Franklin.

Death
On October 20, 2008, Hickerson died just outside Cleveland, Ohio. The Browns added a "GH" tribute badge to their helmets for the 2008 season in his honor. he died at 10:20 AM

References

External links
 

1935 births
2008 deaths
American football offensive guards
Cleveland Browns players
Ole Miss Rebels football players
American Conference Pro Bowl players
Eastern Conference Pro Bowl players
Pro Football Hall of Fame inductees
People from Carroll County, Tennessee
People from Trenton, Tennessee
Players of American football from Tennessee